The Clue in the Crossword Cipher is the forty-fourth volume in the Nancy Drew Mystery Stories series. It was first published in 1967 under the pseudonym Carolyn Keene. The actual author was ghostwriter Harriet Stratemeyer Adams.

Plot 
A woman named Carla Ponce invites Nancy, Bess, and George to Peru to help decipher the mystery in the crossword cipher—a wooden plaque that promises to lead them to a wonderful treasure. Nancy must find the treasure before a gang of thieves led by El Gato (The Cat) reach it first.

References

See also 

Nazca lines

Nancy Drew books
1967 American novels
1967 children's books
Novels set in Peru
Grosset & Dunlap books
Children's mystery novels